is a Japanese shōnen manga series written by Yoshiaki Tabata and illustrated by Yuki Yugo. Akumetsu was serialized in Akita Shoten's Weekly Shōnen Champion from 2002 to 2006.

Plot

The setting for the story is a near-future Japan where politicians and businessmen pamper and lavish themselves amidst growing public unrest, while excessive corruption and speculation lead the country to a massive economic downfall, increasing the public deficit to an enormous seven hundred trillion yen and triggering an economic recession. When her father's company goes bankrupt, Shiina finds out and resolves to sell herself into prostitution by attending high-class parties through an escort agency, in order to help pay off her family's debt.

It is during the first and only such party she attends, where the guests were mainly VIPs and high-profile officials of the Ministry of Finance, and what was set to become an orgy, is suddenly interrupted by a young man wearing an Oni mask, who after giving a speech on how savage and corrupt the upper class of Japan has become, shoots the attendants in order to state his point and then proceeds to brutally slaughter the most prominent guest using a fire axe. Recognized by a frantic Shiina as Shou, the man simply waves the statement off as a misunderstanding, then grabs the mauled body of his victim and walks calmly to the front lobby, where he is gunned down by police and, before dying, has his head blown off by a device implanted into his own mask.

Thus, the act introduces a long, exceptionally violent campaign of murders performed by such masked individuals, targeting those who are deemed as responsible for the massive economic crisis and, as such, labeled as evil by the masked men, who all goes by the common alias Akumetsu (literally destroyer of evil).

Release

Reception

See also
 Runaway Horses

References

Further reading
Animeland issue #120 (April 2006)

External links
Akumetsu at J Pop 
Akumetsu at Taifu comics 
Manga-news.com vol. 12 review 
Manga-news.com vol. 13 review 
Manga-news.com vol. 14 review 
Manga-news.com vol. 16 review 
Manga-news.com vol. 17 review 
Planete BD vol. 12 review 
Planete BD vol. 13 review 
Planete BD vol. 14 review 
Planete BD vol. 15 review 
Planete BD vol. 16 review 

2002 manga
Shōnen manga
Akita Shoten manga